Valentin Senger (28 December 1918, in Frankfurt – 4 September 1997, in Frankfurt) was a German writer and journalist. He is best known for his 1978 autobiography, Kaiserhofstraße 12, recounting his childhood at the central Frankfurt street Kaiserhofstraße as the son of Russian-Jewish immigrants who survived the Nazi era undetected. The book appeared in English in 1980 under the title The Invisible Jew, and was adapted into a motion picture in the same year.

Works 
 Die Brücke von Kassel. Verlag Neues Leben, Berlin 1954
 Am seidenen Faden. Verlag Neues Leben, Berlin 1956
 Kaiserhofstraße 12. Darmstadt/Neuwied 1978, Schöffling & Co., Frankfurt am Main 2010 
 Kurzer Frühling. Frankfurt/Main, 1984
 (with Klaus Meier-Ude): Die jüdischen Friedhöfe in Frankfurt/Main. 3. ed., Frankfurt/M 2004 (first ed. 1985)
 Einführung in die Sozialpolitik. Soziale Sicherheit für alle. Reinbek bei Hamburg, Mai 1970
 Die Buchsweilers. Frankfurt/Main 1994 (first ed. Hamburg und Zürich 1991)
 Das Frauenbad und andere jüdische Geschichten. Munich 1994
 Der Heimkehrer. Eine Verwunderung über die Nachkriegszeit. First ed. Munich 1995
 Die rote Turnhose und andere Fahnengeschichten. Munich 1997

References 

1918 births
1997 deaths
German autobiographers
20th-century German journalists